Simone Fontana (born May 7, 1991) is a bobsledder from Italy. He competed for Italy at the 2014 Winter Olympics in the two bobsleigh events.

References

1991 births
Living people
Olympic bobsledders of Italy
Bobsledders at the 2014 Winter Olympics
Bobsledders at the 2018 Winter Olympics
Italian male bobsledders